Effective altruism is a philosophical and social movement that advocates "using evidence and reason to figure out how to benefit others as much as possible, and taking action on that basis". People who pursue the goals of effective altruism, called , often choose careers based on the amount of good that they expect the career to achieve or donate to charities based on the goal of maximising impact. The movement developed during the 2000s, and the name  was coined in 2011. Prominent philosophers influential to the movement include Peter Singer, Toby Ord, and William MacAskill. Several books and many articles about the movement have since been published, and the Effective Altruism Global conference has been held since 2013. As of 2022, several billion dollars have been committed to effective altruist causes.

Popular cause priorities within effective altruism include global health and development, social inequality, animal welfare, and risks to the survival of humanity over the long-term future. Effective altruism emphasizes impartiality and the global equal consideration of interests when choosing beneficiaries. This has broad applications to the prioritization of scientific projects, entrepreneurial ventures, and policy initiatives estimated to save the most lives or reduce the most suffering.

History 

Beginning in the late 2000s, several communities centered around altruist, rationalist, and futurological concerns started to converge, such as:

 The evidence-based charity community centered around GiveWell, including Open Philanthropy which originally came out of GiveWell Labs but then became independent
 The community around pledging and career selection for effective giving, centered around the Giving What We Can and 80,000 Hours organisations
 The Singularity Institute (now MIRI) for studying the safety of artificial intelligence and the LessWrong discussion forum

In 2011, Giving What We Can and 80,000 Hours decided to incorporate into an umbrella organization and held a vote for their new name; the "Centre for Effective Altruism" was selected. The "Effective Altruists" Facebook group was set-up in November 2012. The Effective Altruism Global conference has been held since 2013. As the movement formed, it attracted individuals who were not part of a specific community, but who had been following the Australian moral philosopher Peter Singer's work on applied ethics, particularly "Famine, Affluence, and Morality" (1972), Animal Liberation (1975), and The Life You Can Save (2009). Singer himself used the term in 2013, in a TED talk titled "The Why and How of Effective Altruism".

Singer published The Most Good You Can Do: How Effective Altruism Is Changing Ideas About Living Ethically in 2015. In the same year, the Scottish philosopher and ethicist William MacAskill published Doing Good Better: How Effective Altruism Can Help You Make a Difference. In 2018, American news website Vox launched its Future Perfect section, led by journalist Dylan Matthews, which publishes articles and podcasts on "finding the best ways to do good". In the same year, 80,000 Hours identified economist Yew-Kwang Ng as anticipating many of the ideas of effective altruism in his research on welfare economics and moral philosophy.

In 2019, Oxford University Press published the volume Effective Altruism: Philosophical Issues, edited by Hilary Greaves and Theron Pummer. In 2020, the Australian moral philosopher Toby Ord published The Precipice: Existential Risk and the Future of Humanity, while MacAskill published What We Owe the Future in 2022.

Philosophy 
Effective altruists focus on the many philosophical questions related to the most effective ways to benefit others. Such philosophical questions shift the starting point of reasoning from "what to do" to "why" and "how". There is little consensus on the answers, and there are differences between effective altruists who believe that they should do the most good they possibly can with all of their resources and those who only try do the most good they can within a defined budget.

The view of effective altruism as doing the most good one can within a defined budget can be compatible with a wide variety of views on morality and meta-ethics, as well as traditional religious teachings on altruism such as in Christianity. Effective altruism can also be in tension with religion where religion emphasizes spending resources on worship and evangelism instead of causes that do the most good.

Other than Peter Singer and William MacAskill, philosophers associated with effective altruism include Nick Bostrom, Toby Ord, Hilary Greaves, and Derek Parfit.

Impartiality

EA emphasizes impartial reasoning in that everyone's well-being counts equally. Singer, in his 1972 essay "Famine, Affluence, and Morality", wrote:

It makes no moral difference whether the person I can help is a neighbor's child ten yards away from me or a Bengali whose name I shall never know, ten thousand miles away ... The moral point of view requires us to look beyond the interests of our own society.

An important consideration for moral impartiality is the question of which beings are deserving of moral consideration. Some effective altruists consider the well-being of non-human animals in addition to humans, and advocate for animal welfare issues such as ending factory farming. Those who subscribe to longtermism include future generations as possible beneficiaries and try to improve the moral value of the long-term future by, for example, reducing existential risks.

William Schambra has criticized the impartial logic of effective altruism, arguing that benevolence arising from reciprocity and face-to-face interactions is stronger and more prevalent than charity based on impartial, detached altruism. Such community-based charitable giving, he writes, is foundational to civil society and, in turn, democracy.

Cause prioritization
A key component of effective altruism is "cause prioritization". Cause prioritization is based on the principle of cause neutrality, the idea that resources should be distributed to causes based on what will do the most good, irrespective of the identity of the beneficiary and the way in which they are helped. By contrast, many non-profits emphasize effectiveness and evidence with respect to a single cause such as education or climate change.

EA-based organizations prioritize cause areas by following the importance, tractability, and neglectedness framework. Importance is the amount of value that would be created if a problem were solved, tractability is the fraction of a problem that would be solved if additional resources were devoted to it, and neglectedness is the quantity of resources already committed to a cause.

The information required for cause prioritization may involve data analysis, comparing possible outcomes with what would have happened under other conditions (counterfactual reasoning), and identifying uncertainty. The difficulty of these tasks has led to the creation of organizations that specialize in researching the relative prioritization of causes.

This practice of "weighing causes and beneficiaries against one another" was criticized by Ken Berger and Robert Penna of Charity Navigator for being "moralistic, in the worst sense of the word" and "elitist". William MacAskill responded to Berger and Penna, defending the rationale for comparing one beneficiary's interests against another and concluding that such comparison is difficult and sometimes impossible but often necessary. MacAskill argued that the more pernicious form of elitism was that of donating to art galleries (and like institutions) instead of charity. Ian David Moss suggested that the criticism of cause prioritization could be resolved by what he called "domain-specific effective altruism", which would encourage "that principles of effective altruism be followed within an area of philanthropic focus, such as a specific cause or geography" and could resolve the conflict between local and global perspectives for some donors.

Cost-effectiveness
Some charities are considered to be far more effective than others, as charities may spend different amounts of money to achieve the same goal, and some charities may not achieve the goal at all. Effective altruists seek to identify interventions that are highly cost-effective in expectation. Many interventions have uncertain benefits, and the expected value of one intervention can be higher than that of another if its benefits are larger, even if it has a smaller chance of succeeding. Non-profits which undertake health interventions are selected based on their impact as measured by lives extended per dollar, quality-adjusted life years (QALY) added per dollar, or disability-adjusted life years (DALY) reduced per dollar.

Some effective altruist organizations prefer randomized controlled trials as a primary form of evidence, as they are commonly considered the highest level of evidence in healthcare research. Others have argued that requiring this stringent level of evidence unnecessarily narrows the focus to issues where the evidence can be developed. Kelsey Piper argues that uncertainty is not a good reason for effective altruists to avoid acting on their best understanding of the world, because most interventions have mixed evidence regarding their effectiveness. Pascal-Emmanuel Gobry and others have warned about the "measurement problem", with issues such as medical research or government reform worked on "one grinding step at a time", and results being hard to measure with controlled experiments. Gobry also argues that such interventions risk being undervalued by the effective altruism movement.

Counterfactual reasoning
Counterfactual reasoning involves considering the possible outcomes of alternative choices. It has been employed by effective altruists in a number of contexts, including career choice. Many people assume that the best way to help others is through direct methods, such as working for a charity or providing social services. However, since there is a high supply of candidates for such positions, it makes sense to compare the amount of good one candidate does to how much good the next-best candidate would do. According to this reasoning, the marginal impact of a career is likely to be smaller than the gross impact.

Cause priorities

The principles and goals of effective altruism are wide enough to support furthering any cause that allows people to do the most good, while taking into account cause neutrality. Many people in the effective altruism movement have prioritized global health and development, animal welfare, and mitigating risks that threaten the future of humanity.

Global health and development
The alleviation of global poverty and neglected tropical diseases has been a focus of some of the earliest and most prominent organizations associated with effective altruism. Charity evaluator GiveWell was founded by Holden Karnofsky and Elie Hassenfeld in 2007 to address poverty, where they believe additional donations to be the most impactful. GiveWell's leading recommendations include: malaria prevention charities Against Malaria Foundation and Malaria Consortium, deworming charities Schistosomiasis Control Initiative and Deworm the World Initiative, and GiveDirectly for direct cash transfers to beneficiaries. The organization The Life You Can Save, which originated from Singer's book of the same name, works to alleviate global poverty by promoting evidence-backed charities, conducting philanthropy education, and changing the culture of giving in affluent countries.

Animal welfare

Improving animal welfare has been a focus of many effective altruists. Singer and Animal Charity Evaluators (ACE) have argued that effective altruists should prioritize changes to factory farming over pet welfare. 60 billion land animals are slaughtered and between 1 and 2.7 trillion individual fish are killed each year for human consumption. 

A number of non-profit organizations have been established that adopt an effective altruist approach toward animal welfare. ACE evaluates animal charities based on their cost-effectiveness and transparency, particularly those tackling factory farming. Other animal initiatives affiliated with effective altruism include Animal Ethics' and Wild Animal Initiative's work on wild animal suffering, addressing farm animal suffering with cultured meat, and expanding the circle of concern so that people care more about all kinds of animals. Faunalytics focuses on animal welfare research. The Sentience Institute is a think tank founded to expand the moral circle to other species.

Long-term future and global catastrophic risks

The ethical stance of longtermism, emphasizing the importance of positively influencing the long-term future, developed closely in relation to effective altruism. Longtermists believe that the welfare of future individuals is just as important as the welfare of currently existing individuals, as the prioritization of the former is coextensive with the wellness of the latter. Toby Ord has stated that "the people of the future may be even more powerless to protect themselves from the risks we impose than the dispossessed of our own time."

In particular, the importance of addressing existential risks such as dangers associated with biotechnology and advanced artificial intelligence is often highlighted and the subject of active research.

Organizations that work actively on research and advocacy for improving the long-term future, and have connections with the effective altruism community, are the Future of Humanity Institute at the University of Oxford, the Centre for the Study of Existential Risk at the University of Cambridge, and the Future of Life Institute. In addition, the Machine Intelligence Research Institute is focused on the more narrow mission of managing advanced artificial intelligence.

Approaches 
Effective altruists pursue different approaches to doing good, such as donating to effective charitable organizations, using their career to make more money for donations or directly contributing their labor, and starting new non-profit or for-profit ventures.

Donation
Many effective altruists engage in significant charitable donation. Some believe it is a moral duty to alleviate suffering through donations if other possible uses of those funds do not offer comparable benefits to oneself. Some even lead a frugal lifestyle in order to donate more.

Giving What We Can (GWWC) is an organization whose members pledge to donate at least 10% of their future income to the causes that they believe are the most effective. GWWC was founded in 2009 by Toby Ord, who lives on £18,000 ($27,000) per year and donates the balance of his income. In 2020, Ord said that people had donated over $100 million to date through the GWWC pledge.

Founders Pledge is a similar initiative, founded out of the non-profit Founders Forum for Good, whereby entrepreneurs make a legally binding commitment to donate a percentage of their personal proceeds to charity in the event that they sell their business. As of February 2022, roughly 1,700 entrepreneurs had pledged over $7 billion and over $500 million had been donated.

An estimated $416 million was donated to effective charities identified by the movement in 2019, representing a 37% annual growth rate since 2015. Two of the largest donors in the effective altruism community, Dustin Moskovitz, who had become wealthy through co-founding Facebook, and his wife Cari Tuna, hope to donate most of their net worth of over $11 billion for effective altruist causes through the private foundation Good Ventures. Other prominent philanthropists influenced by effective altruism include Sam Bankman-Fried, as well as professional poker players Dan Smith and Liv Boeree.

Career choice

Effective altruists often consider using their career to do good, both by direct service and indirectly through their consumption, investment, and donation decisions. 80,000 Hours is an organization that conducts research and gives advice on which careers have the largest positive impact.

Earning to give

Founding effective organizations 

Some effective altruists start non-profit or for-profit organizations to implement cost-effective ways of doing good. On the non-profit side, for example, Michael Kremer and Rachel Glennerster conducted randomized controlled trials in Kenya to find out the best way to improve students' test scores. They tried new textbooks and flip charts, as well as smaller class sizes, but found that the only intervention that raised school attendance was treating intestinal worms in children. Based on their findings, they started the Deworm the World Initiative. From 2013 to August 2022, GiveWell designated Deworm the World as a top charity based on their assessment that mass deworming is "generally highly cost-effective"; however, there is substantial uncertainty about the benefits of mass deworming programs, with some studies finding long-term effects and others not. The Happier Lives Institute conducts research on the effectiveness of cognitive behavioral therapy (CBT) in developing countries; Canopie develops an app that provides cognitive behavioural therapy to women who are expecting or postpartum; Giving Green analyzes and ranks climate interventions for effectiveness; the Fish Welfare Initiative works on improving animal welfare in fishing and aquaculture; and the Lead Exposure Elimination Project works on reducing lead poisoning in developing countries.

Incremental versus systemic change 
While much of the initial focus of effective altruism was on direct strategies such as health interventions and cash transfers, more systematic social, economic, and political reforms have also attracted attention. Mathew Snow in Jacobin wrote that effective altruism "implores individuals to use their money to procure necessities for those who desperately need them, but says nothing about the system that determines how those necessities are produced and distributed in the first place". Philosopher Amia Srinivasan criticized William MacAskill's Doing Good Better for a perceived lack of coverage of global inequality and oppression, while noting that effective altruism is in principle open to whichever means of doing good is most effective, including political advocacy aimed at systemic change. Judith Lichtenberg in The New Republic said that effective altruists "neglect the kind of structural and political change that is ultimately necessary". An article in The Ecologist published in 2016 argued that effective altruism is an apolitical attempt to solve political problems, describing the concept as "pseudo-scientific".

Arguments have been made that movements focused on systemic or institutional change are compatible with effective altruism. Philosopher Elizabeth Ashford posits that people are obligated to both donate to effective aid charities and to reform the structures that are responsible for poverty. Open Philanthropy has given grants for progressive advocacy work in areas such as criminal justice, economic stabilization, and housing reform, despite pegging the success of political reform as being "highly uncertain".

Other criticism 

Other criticisms of effective altruism have included topics such as a narrow-minded focus on distant problems and disregard for more-local needs, a culture of elitism, and insufficient focus on societal change.

Ross Douthat of The New York Times criticized the movement's telescopic philanthropy' aimed at distant populations" and envisioned "effective altruists sitting around in a San Francisco skyscraper calculating how to relieve suffering halfway around the world while the city decays beneath them", while he also praised the movement for providing "useful rebukes to the solipsism and anti-human pessimism that haunts the developed world today".

In response to a version of Singer's drowning child analogy, philosopher Kwame Anthony Appiah in 2006 asked whether the most effective action of a man in an expensive suit, confronted with a drowning child, would not be to save the child and ruin his suit—but rather, sell the suit and donate the proceeds to charity. Appiah believed that he "should save the drowning child and ruin my suit". In a 2015 debate, when presented with a similar scenario of either saving a child from a burning building or saving a Picasso painting to sell and donate the proceeds to charity, MacAskill responded that the effective altruist should save and sell the Picasso. Psychologist Alan Jern called MacAskill's choice "unnatural, even distasteful, to many people", although Jern concluded that effective altruism raises questions "worth asking".

Some have criticized a lack of diversity in effective altruism's proponents. Nitasha Tiku of The Washington Post called the movement a "community of roughly 7,000 adherents—largely young, White men connected to elite schools in the United States and Britain". Philosophers such as Susan Dwyer, Joshua Stein, and Olúfẹ́mi O. Táíwò have criticized effective altruism for furthering the disproportionate influence of wealthy individuals in domains that should be the responsibility of democratic governments and organizations.

Some also have argued that there is a hostile culture for women in the effective altruism movement. In a 2023 Time magazine article, seven women reported various types of misconduct and controversy, accusing men within the movement of using their power to groom younger women for polyamorous sexual relationships. The accusers argued that most of the current members are white males who create an environment where sexual harassment is tolerated, excused or rationalised away. The article also quotes a community liaison from the Centre for Effective Altruism who said that while action has already been taken on some of the reported incidents, the allegations of which they were previously unaware will now be addressed.

In 2019, investor and entrepreneur Sam Bankman-Fried, founder of the cryptocurrency exchange FTX, became associated with the effective altruism movement, announcing that his goal was to "donate as much as [he] can". Bankman-Fried founded the FTX Future Fund, which brought on MacAskill as one of its advisers, and from which MacAskill's Centre for Effective Altruism received a $13.9 million grant. After the company's collapse in late 2022, Bankman-Fried's relationship with effective altruism has been called into question as a public relations strategy, while the movement's embrace of him proved damaging to its reputation. Some journalists asked whether the effective altruist movement was "complicit" in FTX's collapse. However, several leaders of the effective altruism movement, including William MacAskill and Robert Wiblin, condemned FTX's actions. MacAskill emphasized that bringing about good consequences does not justify violating rights or sacrificing integrity.

See also

Notes and references

Further reading

 
 
 
 
 
 
 
 
 
  An article based on the preface and first chapter of Singer's book The Most Good You Can Do was published in the Boston Review on July 1, 2015, with a forum of responses by other writers and a final response by Singer.

External links

EffectiveAltruism.org, an online introduction and resource compilation on effective altruism
Centre for Effective Altruism, an organization building and nurturing the effective altruism community
Effective Altruism Forum, an effective altruism online forum
Effective Altruism Global, a series of effective altruism conferences
80,000 Hours, an effective altruism non-profit conducting research on which jobs have most positive social impact
Effective Altruism: An Introduction, a series of 10 podcast episodes